Henri Napoléon Marie Maurice Gufflet (15 August 1863 – 22 April 1915) was a French sailor who competed in the 1900 Summer Olympics in Meulan, France. Gufflet took the gold in the first race of the 3 to 10 ton and the silver medal in the second race of that class.

References

External links

 

1863 births
1915 deaths
French male sailors (sport)
Sailors at the 1900 Summer Olympics – 3 to 10 ton
Olympic sailors of France
Olympic silver medalists for France
Olympic bronze medalists for France
Olympic medalists in sailing
Medalists at the 1900 Summer Olympics
People from Port Louis District
Sailors at the 1900 Summer Olympics – Open class